Austin B. Witherbee was a Michigan politician.

Early life
Witherbee moved to the Flint area with his parents in 1841.

Occupation
Witherbee ran a self named drug store downtown and sold it to Charles A. Mason, another mayor of Flint and now the name of a new grocery store set to open in spring 2009 to serve the downtown area at the corner of King Avenue and University Drive, the former old Hats by Jake building.

He opened the first legitimate bank in Flint in 1858 with Mr. Meigs of Boston, Massachusetts and Mr. Stone from Sandy Hill, New Jersey.  The Exchange Bank management by Witherbee was a success such that in the spring of 1864, he purchased his partners' shares until the organization of the First National Bank in 1865.  In the First National Bank, he became the cashier, with H. M. Henderson as president, and O. F. Forsyth as vice-president.

Political life
He was elected as the tenth mayor of the City of Flint in 1867 serving a single 1-year term.

References

Mayors of Flint, Michigan
19th-century American politicians